William Robert FitzGerald, 2nd Duke of Leinster, KP, PC (Ire) (12/13 March 1749 – 20 October 1804) was an Irish liberal politician and landowner. He was born in London.

Career
FitzGerald made his Grand Tour between 1768 and 1769. During the same time, he also was Member of Parliament (MP) for Kildare Borough. FitzGerald then sat in the Irish House of Commons for Dublin City until 1773, when he inherited his father's title and estates. He was appointed High Sheriff of Kildare for 1772. Politically he was a liberal supporter of Henry Grattan's Irish Patriot Party and he co-founded the Irish Whig Club in 1789. He controlled about six Kildare members of the Irish House of Commons. In 1779, he was elected colonel of the Dublin Regiment of the Irish Volunteers.

In 1770, FitzGerald was chosen Grandmaster of the masonic Grand Lodge of Ireland, which post he held for two years. He was re-elected for another year in 1777. In 1783 he was among the first knights in the newly created Order of St. Patrick.

In 1788–9, he was Master of the Rolls in Ireland; in theory a senior judicial office, it was then largely a sinecure, but so blatant a choice of a man who wholly unqualified for it gave rise to unfavourable comment, and a few years later it became the rule that the Master must be a lawyer of repute.

FitzGerald was a supporter of Catholic emancipation and helped to found the Catholic seminary at Maynooth on land he donated, in 1795. Withdrawing from Parliament with Grattan in 1797, he moved to England to be with his sick wife and remained there during the 1798 rebellion.

Family

He was the second, but eldest surviving, son of James FitzGerald, 1st Duke of Leinster, and the well-connected Lady Emily Lennox. He was also the elder brother of the 1790s revolutionary Lord Edward FitzGerald, and was a first cousin of the English liberal politician Charles James Fox. On 4 or 7 November 1775 he married The Hon. Emilia Olivia Usher St George (died 23 June 1798, London), daughter of The 1st Baron Saint George and Elizabeth Dominick. Their children were:
 Lady Mary Rebecca FitzGerald (6 May 1777 – 28 September 1842). Married 15 April 1799, Sir Charles Lockhart-Ross, 7th Baronet.
 Lady Emily Elizabeth FitzGerald (13 May 1778 – 9 February 1856). Married 13 March 1801, John Joseph Henry of Straffan.
 Lady Elizabeth FitzGerald (1780 – 28 February 1857). Married 22 July 1805, Sir Edward Baker, 1st Baronet.
 George FitzGerald, Marquess of Kildare (20 June 1783 – 10 February 1784).
 Lady Cecilia Olivia Geraldine FitzGerald (3 March 1786 – London, 27 July 1863). Married 18 August 1806, Thomas Foley, 3rd Baron Foley.
 Lady Olivia Letitia Catherine FitzGerald (9 September 1787 – 28 February 1858). Married 8 May 1806, Charles Kinnaird, 8th Baron Kinnaird.
 Augustus FitzGerald, 3rd Duke of Leinster (1791 – 1874). Married Lady Charlotte Augusta Stanhope.
 Lord William Charles O'Brien FitzGerald (4 January 1793 – 8 December 1864). Married and had issue:
 Geraldine Sydney FitzGerald (died 1896). Married 2 October 1855, Henry William Paget Butler.
 Lady Isabella Charlotte FitzGerald (died 1868). Married 1 June 1809, Major-General Louis Guy Charles Guillaume de Rohan-Chabot, Comte de Jarnac. Had issue:
Philippe-Ferdinand-Auguste de Rohan-Chabot (1815-1875). Comte de Jarnac.

His homes were at Carton, where he died, and Kilkea in County Kildare, and at Leinster House in Dublin (now the home of the Oireachtas). He was a founder member of the Order of St Patrick in 1783 and of the Royal Irish Academy (1785), and was a large investor in the Royal Canal company launched in 1790. His family's estates of 60,000 acres (25,000 Ha) in Kildare were in three main parts, around Maynooth, Rathangan and Athy. He rebuilt the main bridge in Athy over the River Barrow.

See also
Duke of Leinster

Notes

William
1749 births
1804 deaths
Irish MPs 1761–1768
Irish MPs 1769–1776
Knights of St Patrick
Members of the Privy Council of Ireland
19th-century Irish people
High Sheriffs of Kildare
Masters of the Rolls in Ireland
Members of the Parliament of Ireland (pre-1801) for County Dublin constituencies
Members of the Parliament of Ireland (pre-1801) for County Kildare constituencies
Members of the Royal Irish Academy
Dukes of Leinster (1766)
Irish knights